Lukas Ahlefeld Engel (born 14 December 1998) is a Danish professional footballer who plays as a midfielder for Danish Superliga club Silkeborg IF.

Club career
He made his Danish Superliga debut for Vejle on 2 February 2021 in a game against AGF. On 31 January 2022, Engel was loaned out to Danish 1st Division club Silkeborg IF for the rest of the season. On 21 June 2022 the club confirmed, that they had bought Engel free from his contract with Vejle, and signed a five-year deal.

References

External links
 

1998 births
Living people
Danish men's footballers
Association football midfielders
Fremad Amager players
Vejle Boldklub players
Silkeborg IF players
Denmark Series players
Danish 1st Division players
Danish Superliga players
People from Tårnby Municipality
Sportspeople from the Capital Region of Denmark